Devil's Dyke  may refer to:

Devil's Dykes, a series of Roman fortifications between Hungary and Serbia
Devil's Dyke, Cambridgeshire, an earthen barrier in eastern Cambridgeshire
Devil's Dyke, Hertfordshire, a prehistoric defensive ditch in Hertfordshire
Devil's Dyke, Sussex, a valley on the South Downs Way

See also:
Deil's Dyke, earthwork in Scotland